Brag or BRAG may refer to:
to boast
 Brag (folklore), a creature from the folklore of Northumbria, England
Three card brag, a British card game
Bicycle Ride Across Georgia
Brag, a character in The Trigan Empire, a science fiction comic series
Eva Brag, Swedish writer

See also
 Bragg (disambiguation)
 June Bragger (1929–1997), English cricketer